Wapakman is a Philippine superhero film directed by Topel Lee and starring eight-division world boxing champion Manny Pacquiao. It was released on December 25, 2009, as an entry to the 2009 Metro Manila Film Festival.

Cast
Manny Pacquiao as Magno Meneses
Rufa Mae Quinto as Magda Meneses
Bianca King as Mystika
Krista Ranillo as Birita Octavia/Screamer
Keanna Reeves as Lenlen
Barbie Forteza as Patitang Meneses
Polo Ravales as Emerson Pochochay/Combuster
Onyok Velasco as Goliath
Mica Torre as Maegan Meneses
Chacha Cañete as Maricel Meneses
Long Mejia as Kadyo
Benjie Paras as Kulas
Jairus Aquino as Dingdong Meneses
Jojo Alejar as Dr. Rex
Socorro Garcia Bellen as Coring

Reception
The film was not well received by the public, and on the first day of opening landed last place in the box-office in the two-week Metro Manila Film Festival. It was also one of two films (the other being Nobody, Nobody But... Juan starring Dolphy) to not win an award during the festival, it was considered a box office flop of 2009.

See also
Box office bomb

References

External links

2009 films
2000s Tagalog-language films
Philippine action films
Philippine superhero films
2000s superhero films
Films directed by Topel Lee
2000s English-language films